is an action role-playing video game developed by HAL Laboratory and Creatures Inc., published by The Pokémon Company and distributed by Nintendo for the Nintendo DS video game console. The game was released at various dates, varying between continents. The game was released in Japan on March 23, 2006; in North America and Australia during 2006 and in Europe in April 2007. It was released on the European Wii U Virtual Console on February 25, 2016.

Pokémon Ranger is compatible with Pokémon Diamond and Pearl, Platinum, HeartGold and SoulSilver allowing players to transfer the egg of the legendary Pokémon Manaphy to those games. This game is set in the Fiore region.

Gameplay
Pokémon Ranger is a role-playing game which is designed in a format radically different from that of traditional Pokémon RPGs. The player controls a Pokémon Ranger in the Fiore region and catches Pokémon, temporarily, by using a device called a "capture styler", which is controlled by the stylus. The storyline of the game is set out in 10 main missions with three sub-missions. The only Pokémon that travels permanently with the player is a Minun if the player chooses the male hero or Plusle if the player chooses the female hero. The player must loop the Pokémon with the "styler" a certain number of times to capture them. Pokémon may attempt to flee the styler or attack it. The styler has an energy bar that is similar to an HP counter for Pokémon on the other Pokémon adventure games, when the energy bar of the styler is completely depleted, the player is transported to the last save terminal. The styler can be recharged in a Pokémon center like manner at a ranger base, save points are in the bases and scattered throughout the game. There is a quick save option to use in emergencies when a save port can't be found or is too far away. Temporarily caught Pokémon can be used in the field to accomplish tasks and solve puzzles by cutting, tackling, shooting fire, blowing water, etc. They can also be used to enhance the styler's loop line. For example, if a water Pokémon is selected to aid in capturing a new Pokémon, the styler will produce a temporary bubble that immobilizes the target, preventing it from attacking or fleeing.

Plot

Setting
Pokémon Ranger is set in the Fiore region. The region's name originates from the Italian word for flower. The Go-Rock Squad is the resident crime syndicate of this region. Fiore itself does not have any native Pokémon, but has many Pokémon from other regions. It also does not have any Pokémon Trainers. All people who live with Pokémon keep them outside of Poké Balls, like pets, as Pokémon are never trained here. Fiore is located quite some distance from the other regions of the Pokémon world up to the third generation. It is a relatively small island region that is quite mountainous. There are four major settlements in Fiore, each named after the season it constantly experiences — Ringtown (spring) to the west, Fall City (fall) to the east, Wintown (winter) at foot of mountains to the north and Summerland (summer) on an island to the south. The Krokka Tunnel connects Fall City and Ringtown. From there, one can also get to the Panula Cave, which is also accessible from Summerland's harbor via water vehicle (aka the AquaMole), the coldest spot of the Fiore region, hence ice Pokémon appearing there, including the legendary Regice. It leads to Wintown, located on the foot of the Sekra Range. The Sekra Range is a  mountain range that is notable for having a waterfall that can "fill the Capture Arena 23 times in one minute"; housing the Go-Rock Squad's base; a house high up where the residents inside will recharge the player's Styler; "Shiftree", a tree where five Shiftry live in and will attack the player all at the same time; and the Fiore Temple, an ancient temple mountain currently home to a lot of wild Pokémon, but with a strange door that will only open when you capture the 3 wanted Pokémon; where the game's climax takes place, located at the very summit of the Sekra Range. On the same island where Summerland is located on is a big jungle called the Olive Jungle. Numerous Bug- and Grass-type Pokémon live here, and in the center is a ruin, with the same symbols on Kyogre, called the Jungle Relic. In the past, Rangers came to the Relic to test themselves. There are four Challenges involving Dragon Pokémon, each representing one of the four classical elements: the Challenge of Destruction (Earth), the Challenge of Wind (Air), the Challenge of Fire and the Challenge of Water. These Pokémon are Flygon, Salamence, Charizard, and Kingdra respectively, as on the cover of Pokémon Ranger. It is said that should all four be cleared, a catastrophe will befall Fiore. After beating the game, the player may roam around free to do almost anything. There is also the Ranger Net for special missions after the main missions.  In these missions, the main character is required to capture 3 legendary Pokémon not seen anywhere else in the game; Deoxys, Celebi, and Mew. If the code for the special Manaphy mission is unlocked, it can be used to get the Manaphy Egg, which can later be transferred to Pokémon Diamond, Pearl, and Platinum.

Characters

The storyline revolves around a single Pokémon Ranger — Lunick or Solana, depending on the player's choice. In addition to the protagonist characters in the game, several other Pokémon Rangers are part of the Ranger Union. Each ranger leader holds domain over that town's rangers. These rangers are named Cameron, Elita, Joel, and Spenser. A professor named Professor Hastings also plays a significant role in the game, as the Chief of Technology for the Ranger Union. The new villainous group, the Go-Rock Squad, has four sub-leaders called the Go-Rock Quads, the leader's three sons and daughter. The Quads have a motto they repeat every time they are encountered. Their original plot is to use the Super Styler, a more powerful version of the original Styler that resembles an organ, to take control of Entei, Suicune, and Raikou to attack citizens of Fiore. They would then command them to stop, leading people to believe the Go-Rock Squad were heroes. They would afterwards command Pokémon to start other problems and charge money to solve the problem. The player is then required to prove their worth in three extra post ending missions and capture the enraged legendaries; Kyogre, Groudon, and Rayquaza.

Development
Information regarding Pokémon Ranger was published in the July 2005 issue of CoroCoro Comic magazine. Little details were shared, which mostly hinted that it was a game and a movie. An announcement on Pokémon Ranger came as a short teaser at the end of the 8th Pokémon film, Pokémon: Lucario and the Mystery of Mew. This game's development was confused for being the same game as Pokémon Mystery Dungeon.

Promotion
A few episodes of the Pokémon animated series have included Pokémon Rangers. They go on special missions to help preserve Pokémon and human relations, and they are closely related to Pokémon breeders. They also have a device that allows them to temporarily control wild Pokémon; this device also allows them to scan Pokémon, check how healthy they are, and make sure that they are not being interfered with by outside forces. Solana herself has appeared in three episodes of the Pokémon anime, in one of which Solana must stop a disturbed Deoxys.

Several Pokémon Rangers can also be battled in Pokémon Ruby and Sapphire, FireRed and LeafGreen, Emerald, Diamond and Pearl, Platinum, Black and White and are depicted as protecting the environment and wild Pokémon. These Rangers own Pokémon which they keep in Poké Balls, and are not true rangers but still have similar intentions to true Pokémon Rangers.

A direct-to-DVD animated film adaptation Pokémon Ranger and the Temple of the Sea premièred on Cartoon Network on March 23, 2007, and released on DVD the succeeding month. The movie starred a new Ranger named Jack Walker, or Jackie, whose job is to protect a Legendary Manaphy Egg which Ash and company also help in protecting.

Merchandise
A game watch has been manufactured in the theme of Pokémon Ranger. The watch is designed to look like the Pokémon Rangers' Capture Styler used for capturing Pokémon. The Pokémon can be used to help the styler by making bubbles or having leaf blades shoot out or having it on fire.

Reception

Pokémon Ranger sold 193,337 copies in Japan on its release week. In terms of games reviews, Pokémon Ranger received fairly positive reaction, with a 70% ratio from GameRankings. IGN gave the game an overall score of 7.1 out of 10, citing the presentation, gameplay and graphics as the game's strong points but also citing the game's use of sound as a major drawback, with issues such as the game's use of the 8-bit sounds from the original Game Boy games as Pokémon cries. A lack of a multi-player mode was also a negative point in IGN's review.

GameSpot gave a similar review to IGN, giving the game a 7.5 out of 10 overall. GameSpot commented that the game's "unique capturing system", "good-sized quest" and "attractive 2D graphics and animation" were the games good points while also commenting that issues such as possible scratching of the touch screen during capture and "basic exploration sequences" were the games notable bad points. While discussing the mixed quality of Pokémon spin-offs, Retronauts podcaster Jeremy Parish cited Pokémon Ranger as an example, with Parish later referring to it as "crappy". He cites the dialogue and story, commenting that while Pokémon was a kiddy game, the writing in Ranger is worse than in the main games. Fellow Retronauts contributor Justin Haywald criticized HAL Laboratory, which he says is normally a good developer, for making Ranger.

As of March 31, 2008, Pokémon Ranger has sold 2.70 million copies worldwide.

Sequels

Pokémon Ranger: Shadows of Almia
Pokémon Ranger: Shadows of Almia is the sequel to Pokémon Ranger, and is developed by Creatures Inc. for the Nintendo DS video game console. It was announced in the January 2008 issue of CoroCoro and was released in Japan on March 20, 2008. It was announced at E3 2008 that the game would be released in the United States under the title Shadows of Almia on November 10, 2008. It was announced on September 25 that the game would be released in Europe under the title Shadows of Almia on November 21, 2008. The game features 270 Pokémon, including new Pokémon which were not featured in the original Pokémon Ranger, from Pokémon Diamond and Pearl. The game utilizes the Nintendo WiFi Connection to download new missions.

Pokémon Ranger: Guardian Signs

Pokémon Ranger: Guardian Signs (ポケモンレンジャー 光の軌跡, Pokémon Renjā Hikari no Kiseki, "Pokémon Ranger: Tracks of Light") is an action role-playing video game developed by Creatures Inc., published by The Pokémon Company and distributed by Nintendo for the Nintendo DS. It is the sequel to Pokémon Ranger and Pokémon Ranger: Shadows of Almia and it is the third installment of its series. It was released in Japan on March 6, 2010, North America on October 4, 2010, and Europe on November 5, 2010. It was released on the European Wii U Virtual Console on June 9, 2016. Gameplay revolves around capturing Pokémon with the Capture Styler by drawing circles around them. The game received mixed or average reviews, with Metacritic and GameRankings both giving it a 69%.

References

External links
 

Role-playing video games
Action role-playing video games
HAL Laboratory games
Video games featuring protagonists of selectable gender
Nintendo DS games
2006 video games
Video games developed in Japan
Video games set on fictional islands
Virtual Console games
Virtual Console games for Wii U
Ranger